The South Coast AVA is an American Viticultural Area in the state of California that encompasses grape-growing regions in five counties of Southern California: Los Angeles, Orange, Riverside, San Bernardino, and San Diego. This large appellation includes a number of smaller sub-appellations that all share the common ecology trait of having warm weather moderated by cooling coastal influences from the Pacific Ocean.

References 

Geography of Southern California
Geography of Los Angeles County, California
Geography of Orange County, California
Geography of Riverside County, California
Geography of San Bernardino County, California
Geography of San Diego County, California
Agriculture in Riverside County, California
American Viticultural Areas
1985 establishments in California